Neotropical Ichtyhology is a peer-reviewed scientific journal focusing on all aspects of Neotropical ichthyology. It is published by the Sociedade Brasileira de Ictiologia (Brazilian Society of Ichthyology) and is its official publication. The journal was established in 2003 and is edited by Carla S. Pavanelli.

Indexing and abstracting
Neotropical Ichthyology is indexed and abstracted in:

External links
Neotropical Ichthyology website
Sociedade Brasileira de Ictiologia Homepage 

Biology journals
Quarterly journals
Publications established in 2003
English-language journals